Ente Mamattukkuttiyammakku (also known as Ente Mamattikkuttiyammakku) is a 1983 Indian Malayalam-language family drama film produced by Navodaya Appachan under Navodaya Studio. It was written and directed by Fazil and stars Bharat Gopy, Mohanlal, Shalini, Poornima Jayaram, and Sangeeta Naik. The film was reported to be heavily inspired by the 1982 film Annie. 

In the film, Vinod and Sethu lose their only child in an accident. Years pass and Sethu is still grieving, to comfort her, Vinod adopts a child, Tintumol (Mamattukuttiyamma) from an orphanage. Sethu, initially reluctant to love her, gradually develops an affection for her. But just when things are getting back to normal, Tintumol's biological father Alex starts trailing Vinod constantly requesting to return his daughter. Now, Sethu and Vinod are dragged into a situation where they might lose their second child as well.

Ente Mamattukkuttiyammakku was a major commercial and critical success and became the highest-grossing Malayalam film of the year. The film won four Kerala State Film Awards—Best Film, Best Director, Best Actor (Gopy), and Best Child Artist (Shalini). It was remade in Tamil as En Bommukutty Ammavukku (1988) by Fazil himself, and in Telugu as Paape Maa Praanam.

Plot 
A couple, Sethulakshmi and Vinod, lose their daughter in an accident. The family was traveling in a boat and the couple's daughter goes the top of the boat to play with her doll. The other children throw her doll into the water, making her jump into the water. The couple search for the girl but in vain. They find her floating in the water, which comes as a big shock to Sethu.

Years later, Vinod decides to adopt a girl named Tintu. Sethu didn't want to adopt a child. Still, Vinod forces Sethu to see Tintu in the orphanage. Sethu refuses, as she lost her child and doesn’t want any more. Vinod makes her understand, and Sethu agrees. They adopt Tintu.

After Tintu is brought into the home, the couple become happy as earlier. But problems arise when Alex asks for the child, claiming it to be his wife's child as a result of an affair before their marriage. Initially Sethu refuses, but later gives the child to her real mother.

Cast
 Bharath Gopi as Vinod
 Mohanlal as Alex, Tintu's father
 Shalini as Mamattikuttiyama / Tintumol
 Sangeeta Naik as Sethulakshmi / Sethu
 Poornima Jayaram as Mercy, Tintu's mother
 Thilakan as Fr. Joseph Sebastian
 Rajan P. Dev as Adv. Thomas George

Production

Title 
The film's original title was Ente Mamattukkuttiyammakku, but due to printing mistake it came out as Ente Mamattikkuttiyammakku in posters and publicity materials. Fazil heard the name Mamoottamma from a household in Northern Kerala. He modified that name to create the character Mamattukkuttiyamma.

Casting 
Fazil selected Shalini for the title role immediately after he saw her photograph shown by someone in the production crew. She was three years old when she acted in the film. Although Shalini had already made her debut in Aadyathe Anuraagam, it was Ente Mamattukkuttiyammakku that gave her recognition. "Baby Shalini" became a successful child artist and she appeared in similar roles in her subsequent films.

Filming 
The film was shot in Ernakulam and Alappuzha. The outdoor scenes showing Bharat Gopi's office and work site where shot in Hotel Vivanta near Menaka bus stop. The building was under construction then. The scenes showing Gopi's home were shot in Alappuzha west side near the beach area. Some of the scenes were taken in Kakkanad including Kusumagiri Mental Hospital. The film was made in just 30 days.

Soundtrack
The music was composed by Jerry Amaldev and the lyrics were written by Bichu Thirumala.

Awards
Kerala State Film Awards
 Best Film 
 Best Director - Fazil
 Best Actor – Bharath Gopi
 Best Child Artist – Baby Shalini

References

External links
 

1983 films
1980s Malayalam-language films
Indian children's films
Films about adoption
Malayalam films remade in other languages
Films directed by Fazil
Films produced by Navodaya Appachan
Films scored by Jerry Amaldev